Robert C. Ridder (February 25, 1927 – May 25, 2021) was an American educator and politician in the state of Washington. Ridder served in the Washington State Senate as a Democrat from the 35th District from 1967 to 1973. He attended the University of Washington and earned a Bachelor of Science degree, and completed graduate studies. He was later an educator, serving as a vice principal of a junior high school (Showalter Junior High - Tukwila, WA). He retired from his Senate seat in 1973 and was succeeded by his wife, Ruthe.

References

1927 births
2021 deaths
Democratic Party Washington (state) state senators
University of Washington alumni
Politicians from Bellingham, Washington
Educators from Washington (state)